União Recreativa Cadima commonly known as Cadima, is a Portuguese women's football team based in Cadima, Cantanhede, district of Coimbra.

Players

Current squad

Honours 

 National Championship

 Runners-up (1): 2010–11

 AF Coimbra Cup

 Winners (1): 2018–19

References

External links 

 U.R. Cadima at playmakerstats.com

Women's football clubs in Portugal
Association football clubs established in 1959
1959 establishments in Portugal
Sport in Coimbra
Campeonato Nacional de Futebol Feminino teams